Estádio Lino Correia is a multi-use stadium in Bissau, Guinea Bissau.  It is currently used mostly for football matches and serves as the stadium of Estrela Negra de Bissau of the Campeonato Nacional da Guiné-Bissau.  The stadium holds 5,000 spectators.

External links
Guinea Bissau Stadiums information
Stadium information 

Football venues in Guinea-Bissau
Buildings and structures in Bissau